Gonzalo Güell y Morales de los Ríos (February 16, 1895, in Havana, Cuba – September 2, 1985, in Coral Gables, Florida, U.S.) was a Cuban lawyer and a career diplomat (1919–1959).

Career 
Guell was Foreign Minister of Cuba from 1956 to 1959 and Prime Minister of Cuba from March 12, 1958, to January 1, 1959. He also served as the Cuban Ambassador to Mexico, Colombia, Brazil, Norway and the United Nations.

He was one of the 40 persons that flew with Fulgencio Batista to the Dominican Republic on New Year's Eve 1959 when Fidel Castro took over Cuba.

Personal life 
He was married three times. Two of his wives were Francisca Pubill and Juana Inigo. He had one daughter.

References
 Registro Social de la Habana 1958, Molina Y Cia., S.A.
 Cuban Information Archives
 

Cuban diplomats
Foreign ministers of Cuba
Prime Ministers of Cuba
1895 births
1985 deaths
Ambassadors of Cuba to Mexico
Ambassadors of Cuba to Colombia
Ambassadors of Cuba to Norway
Ambassadors of Cuba to Brazil
Permanent Representatives of Cuba to the United Nations
People of the Cuban Revolution
People from Havana
Cuban people of Catalan descent
1950s in Cuba
20th-century Cuban politicians
Cuban emigrants to the United States